Broadfield is a hamlet and former civil parish, now in the parish of Cottered, in the East Hertfordshire district, in the county of Hertfordshire, England. In 1951 the parish had a population of 20.

Broadfield appears in the Domesday Book of 1086 when it had thirteen households and was split between four owners. No priest was listed at Broadfield, suggesting it was not a parish at that time. By 1222 there was a church at Broadfield, which seems to have been a chapel of ease belonging to the neighbouring parish of Rushden. The church was abandoned in the sixteenth century and no trace above ground now remains. The site is now a wood called Chapel Wood.

Broadfield was included in the Buntingford Poor Law Union from 1835. It was described variously as a former rectory and an extra-parochial area, but was deemed to be a civil parish following the passing of the Extra-Parochial Places Act 1857 and the Poor Law Amendment Act 1866. By this time the settlement at Broadfield had shrunk to be just a couple of farms and cottages; the population of the parish in 1881 was just nineteen. Broadfield was included in the Buntingford Rural District from 1894, which was abolished in 1935 to become part of Braughing Rural District.

The parish of Broadfield was abolished in 1955, becoming part of the parish of Cottered on 1 April 1955.

References

Populated places in Hertfordshire
Former civil parishes in Hertfordshire
East Hertfordshire District